Manel Kouki (born 4 February 1988) is a Tunisian handball player for Stella Sports HB and the Tunisian national team.

She represented Tunisia at the 2013 World Women's Handball Championship in Serbia.

References

External links

Tunisian female handball players
1988 births
Living people
Expatriate handball players
Tunisian expatriates in France